John Aldred may refer to:

 John Aldred (sound engineer) (1921–2020), British sound engineer
 John Alured (1607–1651), or Aldred, army officer
 John E. Aldred (1864–1945), director of United Railways and Electric Company of Baltimore, Maryland
 John William Aldred (1884–1970), English World War I flying ace
 John Aldred (MP) for Kingston upon Hull

See also
 Aldred (surname)